Seri is a village in Harchandpur block of Rae Bareli district, Uttar Pradesh, India. As of 2011, its population is 1,948, in 382 households. It has 3 primary schools and no healthcare facilities.

The 1961 census recorded Seri as comprising 2 hamlets, with a total population of 972 people (484 male and 488 female), in 181 households and 179 physical houses. The area of the village was given as 725 acres and it had a post office at that point.

The 1981 census recorded Seri (as "Sheri") as having a population of 1,165 people, in 230 households, and having an area of 279.65 hectares. The main staple foods were given as wheat and rice.

References

Villages in Raebareli district